Miroslav Novák (26 October 1907, Kyjov, Czechoslovakia – 5 May 2000, Rouen, France was a Czech theologian of the Old Testament, a spiritual bishop and between 1961 and 1990, the patriarch of the Czechoslovak Hussite Church.

Miroslav Novák (Doctor of Theology and Doctor of Philosophy – PhD) was the Bishop of the Prague Diocese of the church from 1946 to 1961 when he was elected patriarch becoming the fourth patriarch of the church since its establishment in 1920. 

In 1990 he set down when he was 83 years old and Vratislav Štěpánek was elected as patriarch.

Patriarch Miroslav Novák spent his last years in Prague and in Rouen, France, where he died on 5 May 2000 at the age of 93.

1907 births
2000 deaths
People from Kyjov
People from the Margraviate of Moravia
Czechoslovak Hussite Church bishops
20th-century archbishops